Jael or Yael ( Yāʿēl) is a heroine in the Hebrew Bible's Book of Judges who delivers Israel from the army of King Jabin of Canaan. After Barak demurs at the behest of the prophetess Deborah, God turns Sisera over to Jael, killing him by driving a tent peg through his skull after he enters her tent near the great tree in Zaanannim near Kedesh.

Name 
The Hebrew ya'el means ibex, a nimble, sure-footed mountain goat native to that region. It literally translates to "he shall ascend or go up".

As of 2016, Yael was one of the most common female first names in contemporary Israel.

Family

Jael has often been understood to be the wife of Heber the Kenite. However, the Hebrew phrase translated this way could also mean "a woman of the group of the Kenites". The Kenites were a nomadic tribe, some of whom lived in close proximity to the Israelites. The Bible records a number of cases of intermarriage; the father-in-law of Moses was apparently a Kenite, but it is not clear whether this was Jethro. The Kenites may have been a part of the Midianite group.

Hever the Kenite
Hever the Kenite was, according to the Book of Judges in the Bible, a descendant of Reuel the Midianite, the father-in-law of Moses. He had separated himself and his wife Jael from the other Kenites and pitched their tent in the plain of Zaanaim, which is near Kedesh in the tribal territory of Naphtali. Heber lived approximately during the 12th century BC in the Hula Valley (anciently known as Zaanaim) of northern Israel during the time of the Israelite judges. According to Jack Sasson, there are reasons to doubt whether the events narrated in Judges 4 ever occurred.

Yael in the Book of Judges

Deborah, a prophetess and judge, advised Barak to mobilize the tribes of Naphtali and Zebulon on Mount Tabor to do battle against King Jabin of Canaan. Barak demurred, saying he would go, provided she would also. Deborah agreed, but prophesied that the honor of defeating Jabin's army would then go to a woman. Jabin's army was led by Sisera (Judg. 4:2). The armies met on the plain of Esdraelon, where Sisera's iron-bound chariots became hampered by the mud caused by a downpour during the night that caused the Wadi Kishon to overflow its banks. The Canaanites were defeated, and Sisera fled the scene.

Sisera arrived on foot at the tent of Heber on the plain of Zaanaim. Heber and his household were at peace with Jabin, the king of Canaan, who reigned in Hazor. Jael, however, sympathized with the Israelites because of the twenty-year period of harsh oppression inflicted on them by Jabin, his commander Sisera, and his nine hundred iron chariots. Jael (whose tent would have been separate from Heber's)  welcomed Sisera into her tent and covered him with a blanket. Sisera asked Jael for a drink of water; she gave him milk instead. He commanded Jael to watch over the tent and tell any inquirers that no one was there. Quietly, Jael took a mallet and drove a tent peg through Sisera's temple into the ground while he was sleeping, killing him instantly. Jael was then the woman with the honor of defeating Jabin's army, as prophesied by Deborah, and she showed Barak Sisera's dead body in her tent. The "Song of Deborah" (Judg. 5:24–26) recounts:

Scholars have long recognized that the Song of Deborah, on the basis of linguistic evidence (archaic biblical Hebrew), is one of the oldest parts of the Bible, dating back to the 12th century BCE.

In ancient and medieval literature

Pseudo-Philo refers to Jael in the book, Liber Antiquitatum Biblicarum:

Now Jael took a stake in her left hand and approached him, saying, "If God will work this sign with me, I know that Sisera will fall into my hands. Behold I will throw him down on the ground from the bed on which he sleeps; and if he does not feel it, I know that he has been handed over." And Jael took Sisera and pushed him onto the ground from the bed. But he did not feel it, because he was very groggy.

And Jael said, "Strengthen in me today, Lord, my arm on account of you and your people and those who hope in you." And Jael took the stake and put it on his temple and struck it with a hammer.

And while he was dying, Sisera said to Jael, "Behold pain has taken hold of me, Jael, and I die like a woman."

And Jael said to him, "Go, boast before your father in hell and tell him that you have fallen into the hands of a woman."

There is also a reference to the story of Jael in Geoffrey Chaucer's The Canterbury Tales. During the Wife of Bath's Prologue, and whilst discussing her fifth husband's "book of wikked wives", Chaucer mentions some wives who "han drive nailes in hir brain, / Whil that they slepte, and thus they had hem slain."

Commentary
Judges 4:17 states that there was peace between the Canaanites and Heber's clan. They were familiar to the Israelites through the connection of Jethro to Moses, and their skill as metalworkers was welcomed wherever they camped. Both sides in the conflict would have considered the Kenites a neutral party. C.E. Schenk notes that Sisera was Jael's guest, "was in the sanctuary of her home, and protected by the laws of hospitality." According to Herbert Lockyer she may have acted out of practical necessity. Sisera was in flight and Barak in pursuit. It would not have been wise to allow Barak to find Sisera in her tent. She also knew that Sisera would be killed if captured; therefore, she would kill him and thus cement a friendship with the victor. Biblical commentaries have viewed Jael as either a heroine or someone much less so. Newsom and Ringe consider her a survivor caught up in her husband's politics. Parallels between the details of Jael's actions and Ehud's assassination of Eglon have led van Wijk-Bos to propose Jael as killing Sisera in a manner similar to his conquering army's use of rape. Jael, along with Ehud, is an example in Judges of the contrast between marginal heroes and well-armed enemies conquered by wit and stealth. Noting the maternal and erotic undertones of the text and some commentators' qualms about Jael's seductive and violent act, Bachmann points out that the Bible itself has nothing but praise for Jael, called most blessed of women in the Song of Deborah.

Christian moral theorists during the Renaissance extensively referred to Jael as an example of tyrannicide.

Artistic depictions of Jael

Medieval images of Jael, mostly in illuminated manuscripts, depicted her as both a defender of Israel and a prefiguration of the Virgin Mary. This can be seen in the Stavelot Bible, the Speculus Darmstadt, as well as several other texts. When not shown in the act of killing Sisera, she carries her hammer and sometimes the spike, making her easy to identify.

In Renaissance works the subject is one of the most commonly shown in the Power of Women topos, with other biblical women who triumphed over men, such as Judith or Delilah. Here she was used to show the risk for men in following women, in groupings including positive figures and scenes such as Judith beheading Holofernes, but mostly ones with females depicted as over-powerful, such as Phyllis riding Aristotle, Samson and Delilah, Salome and her mother Herodias and the Idolatry of Solomon. More positively, Jael was included in sets of the female Nine Worthies, such as the prints by Hans Burgkmair. Ladies sometimes chose to have their portraits painted as Jael, a transformation achieved by holding a hammer and spike.

In the Baroque period, Jael continued to be a sexual figure in art. Works by Gregorio Lazzarini and Artemisia Gentileschi are two examples of an attractive Jael, shown in the act of killing her foe.

Jael is portrayed in the French silent film Jael and Sisera (1911), directed by Henri Andréani.

In popular culture

 Anthony Trollope's novel The Last Chronicle of Barset contains a sub-plot in which the painter Conway Dalrymple paints the heiress Clara Van Siever as Jael driving a "nail" through the head of Sisera.
 P. G. Wodehouse mentions Jael in several of his stories. 
 In The Code of the Woosters, the narrator Bertie Wooster describes the hangover he is experiencing: "Indeed, just before Jeeves came in, I had been dreaming that some bounder was driving spikes through my head—not just ordinary spikes, as used by Jael the wife of Heber, but red-hot ones."
 Bertie also mentions "Jael, wife of Heber" in Right Ho, Jeeves, "Well, as I say, look at Jael, the wife of Heber. Dug spikes into the guest’s coconut while he was asleep, and then went swanking about the place like a Girl Guide. No wonder they say, ‘Oh, woman, woman!"
 In Galahad at Blandings, when the severely hung-over Tipton Plimsoll shakes his head, the narrator remarks, "There are times when shaking the head creates the illusion one has met Jael the wife of Heber, incurred her displeasure and started her going into her celebrated routine."
 In Cocktail Time, Frederick Twistleton describes the face of a member of the Drones Club with "...a look of ecstasy and exaltation such as Jael, the wife of Heber, must have worn when about to hammer the Brazil nut into the head of Sisera...".
 "Jael the wife of Heber" also appears in The Small Bachelor. When George Finch meets his future mother-in-law for the first time she gives him a disapproving look. "It was the kind of look which Sisera might have surprised in the eye of Jael the wife of Heber, had he chanced to catch it immediately before she began operations with the spike."
 Booker Prize winner A.S. Byatt's 1998 collection of short fiction Elementals: Stories of Fire and Ice contains a short story entitled "Jael", which is intricately related to the biblical story of Jael.
 In a half-hour radio drama, Butter in a Lordly Dish (1948), Agatha Christie has her protagonist drug a lawyer's coffee; after revealing her true identity, she hammers a nail into his head.
 The main character in L. P. Hartley's 1960 dystopian novel Facial Justice is named for Jael.
 The central image of Aritha van Herk's novel The Tent Peg refers to the story of Jael and Sisera.
 A chapter in Martin Sugarman's book Fighting Back: British Jewry's Military Contribution in the Second World War (Valentine Mitchell, 2010) is headed "Daughters of Yael: Two Jewish Heroines of the SOE". The author uses the name to illustrate the courage of ATS Denise Bloch and WAAF Muriel Byck of the Special Operation Executive, who were killed in action operating behind German lines in France.
 A section of Laurel Thatcher Ulrich's book Good Wives is entitled "Jael".
 The Christian metalcore band Oh, Sleeper has a song entitled "Hush Yael" on their album Children of Fire.
 Showtime Original Series WEEDS featured character Yael Hoffman (Meital Dohan) in 2006. Andy Botwin (Justin Kirk) goes to a Rabbinical school to dodge military service where he meets Yael Hoffman. In one episode she tells him the biblical story of her first name.
 Stephen Vincent Benet in his poem John Brown's Body refers to Jael and her anger at an enemy  "when the hot dry hands went seeking the nail".
 In Law & Order's sixth season episode "Pro Se" the main suspect suffers from delusions – evoked by his diagnosed schizophrenia – that he is Sisera and is paranoid about women being Jael.
 In Waking the Dead s4ep1, "In Sight of The Lord", a series of murders are committed with a large nail through the head fixing the victim to the floor. The biblical meaning of the act is explored in the process of solving the murders.
 Ezra Glenn's song "Sisera Sleeps" from 2020's "Two-Heel Sandwich" refers to Jael's actions.

Citations

General and cited sources

Further reading
 "Jael". The Wordsworth Encyclopedia of World Religions. Ware: Wordsworth Editions, 1999.

External links

 Jael the Kenite at the Christian Iconography Web site

12th-century BC women
Assassins
Biblical murderers
Biblical women in ancient warfare
Book of Judges people
Hebrew-language names
Kenites
Women in the Hebrew Bible